Calderstones Mansion House, Calderstones Park, Liverpool, was built in 1828 for Joseph Need Walker, a lead shot manufacturer.  It is a 'restrained neo-classical' ashlar mansion of three floors with a separate and extensive stableyard and coach-house which was originally set in 93 acres of parkland. In 1875, the house and estate were acquired by Charles MacIver, co-founder of Cunard Line, for £52,000.

In 1902 the MacIver family Bequeathed the estate of Liverpool Corporation who transformed it into a public park, they soon acquired the adjoining estate of Harthill and established the current 126 acre park.

The Grade II listed building became the offices of the Liverpool Corporation Parks and Gardens department and in the 1940s part of the house was transformed into a self-contained flat for the Assistant Head Gardener.  The 1940s also saw a neo art-deco open-air theatre was constructed at the back of the house, designed by Sir Lancelot Keay.

For most of the 20th Century the mansion housed a tea-room and cafe and was regularly used for wedding receptions, parties and other functions.  In the 1970s the house became council offices and remained that way until 2012.

In January 2012 the council placed the house on the market.

The Reader was awarded Preferred Bidder Status in January 2013. They have a licence agreement to use the buildings for meetings, events and activities, and have a 125-year lease.

In January 2017, The Reader began redevelopment work to restore Calderstones Mansion House, having secured funding from Heritage Lottery Fund, Liverpool City Council and independent funders. The redevelopment was completed in Autumn 2019 when it reopened as The Reader's International Centre for Shared Reading - the world's first public building dedicated to literature and wellbeing. The redevelopment includes the restoration and preservation of the neolithic Calder Stones, which give the local area its name. The Calder Stones now form part of The Calderstones Story, an interactive, permanent exhibition at the Mansion House that tells 5,000 years of local history

References

External links
 http://fungus.org.uk/nwfg/nicholls.htm
 Council Page

Grade II listed buildings in Liverpool